Ciudad Azteca metro station is a station of the Mexico City Metro along Carlos Hank González Avenue (otherwise known as Central Avenue), in Ecatepec de Morelos, State of Mexico, in the metropolitan area of Mexico City. It is an at-grade station with two island platforms that serves as the northern terminus of Line B (the Green-and-Gray Line). It is followed by Plaza Aragón metro station. It serves the colonia (neighborhood) of Ciudad Azteca (es), from which the station takes its name. It is also adjacent to the north end of Mexico's busiest mall (as of 2018), Multiplaza Aragón. The station's pictogram features the silhouette of the neighborhood's glyph.

Ciudad Azteca metro station opened on 30 November 2000 with service southwestward toward Buenavista metro station. In 2019, Ciudad Azteca metro station had an average daily ridership of 58,658 passengers, making it the 12th busiest station in the network and the second-most used on the line. The facilities are accessible for people with disabilities as there are elevators, tactile pavings and braille signage plates.

Location and layout

Ciudad Azteca is a metro station located along Carlos Hank González Avenue (also known as Central Avenue), in Ecatepec de Morelos, State of Mexico, a neighboring municipality of Mexico City. The station serves the colonia (Mexican Spanish for "neighborhood") of Ciudad Azteca (es). Within the system, Plaza Aragón is the next station.

There are four exits (to the north, northeast, south and southeast of the station) all serving Carlos Hank González Avenue and De los Guerreros Boulevard. Opened in 2009, and as of 2015, the hub had no crime reports and had 30 transportation routes operating with an average ridership of 180,000 daily users. Ciudad Azteca metro station is adjacent to the north end of Multiplaza Aragón, the country's busiest mall in 2018.

Ciudad Azteca station has a disabled-accessible service with elevators, tactile pavings and braille signage plates.

History and construction
Line B of the Mexico City Metro was built by Empresas ICA; Ciudad Azteca metro station opened on 30 November 2000, on the first day of the Ciudad Azteca–Buenavista service. The station was built at-grade level. The station's pictogram features the silhouette of the neighborhood's glyph, which depicts a typical Aztec building. The line's workshop and the respective railyard are located after the station.

Ridership
According to the data provided by the authorities since the 2000s, commuters have averaged per year between 30,000 and 65,800 daily entrances in the last decade. In 2019, before the impact of the COVID-19 pandemic on public transport, the station had a ridership of 21,410,326 passengers, which was an increase of 66,504 passengers compared to 2018. In the same year, Ciudad Azteca was the 12th busiest station of the system's 195 stations, and it was the line's second-most used, after Buenavista.

Notes

References

External links

2000 establishments in Mexico
Accessible Mexico City Metro stations
Mexico City Metro Line B stations
Mexico City Metro stations outside Mexico City
Railway stations opened in 2000